"Dirty Sexy Money" is a song by French music producer David Guetta and Dutch music producer Afrojack, featuring guest vocals from English singer Charli XCX and American hip hop recording artist French Montana. It was released on 3 November 2017 as a bonus track from Guetta's seventh studio album, 7 (2018). Noonie Bao and A. G. Cook assisted the artists in writing the song, with production handled by Guetta, Afrojack and American music producer Skrillex.

Background
The song premiered during Guetta's final performance at the Amsterdam Dance Event, when Afrojack joined him on stage. It premiered on Zane Lowe's Beats 1 radio show. Lowe held a FaceTime call with Guetta and Charli XCX, in which Guetta regarded the song as "the record I've been trying to make all my life". Charli XCX said of the recording process: "I was in L.A. working in the studio on, like, a load of David tracks actually. We had kinda done like a couple of things that day and then I heard this track and I just, like, immediately connected with it. I was writing with Noonie Bao and AG Cook and the track just like immediately spoke to me. David came down to the studio and we kinda, like, connected on this song so hard. It just made me wanna party straight away."

Dutch neo-pop artist Selwyn Senatori, who created the song's artwork, talked about how he encountered Guetta: "David and I met through producer Giorgio Tuinfort. During ADE, I invited him to my studio, and the idea of cooperation arose because he was very impressed with what he saw there. I applied my contemporary art to Dirty Sexy Money and for this I consciously chose strong, clear shapes and a raw character. The result is a mix of pop, modern, retro and my own characteristic influences which goes perfectly with the mix of styles from David, Afrojack, Charli XCX and French Montana on the track."

Critical reception
Kat Bein of Billboard described the song as "naughty pop music with a punch and a side of '90s nostalgia". He called the song a "freaky bedroom anthem", and felt it "makes being bad sounds really cute". Chantilly Post of HotNewHipHop wrote that the drop contains "the usual David Guetta/Afrojack sound" and that there are "a lot of repeating of words" throughout the song, which makes it "sounds like a usual pop radio track". Erik of EDM Sauce wrote a negative review of the song, calling the combination of the artists' styles "a bit of an identity crisis rather than a successful integration of defined sounds". Jason Heffler of Earmilk also gave the song a negative review, calling it "a regurgitated made-for-radio snoozer with a moth-eaten arrangement that panders with no regard for originality".

Music video
The heist-themed music video was released on 14 December 2017, and was directed by Charli XCX and Sarah McColgan. In the visual, Guetta stars as the getaway driver, Charli XCX as the boss, Afrojack as the muscle and French Montana as the explosives expert. Masked characters, led by Charli XCX, can be seen chasing a man for his money and robbing an underground bank. XCX's friend and long time collaborator, Brooke Candy, as well as Dorian Electra, Alma and Lizzo also appear in the video alongside French Montana.

Live performances
On 12 November 2017, Guetta performed the song with Charli XCX and Montana at the 2017 MTV Europe Music Awards.

Track listing

Credits and personnel
Credits adapted from Tidal.
 David Guetta – songwriting, production
 Afrojack – songwriting, production
 Charli XCX – songwriting
 French Montana – songwriting
 Noonie Bao – songwriting
 A. G. Cook – songwriting
 Daddy's Groove – master engineering, mixing
 Skrillex – co-production

Charts

Weekly charts

Year-end charts

Certifications

References

2017 songs
2017 singles
Afrojack songs
David Guetta songs
Charli XCX songs
French Montana songs
Songs written by David Guetta
Songs written by Afrojack
Songs written by Charli XCX
Songs written by Noonie Bao
Songs written by French Montana
Songs written by A. G. Cook
Song recordings produced by Skrillex
Song recordings produced by David Guetta